A gubernatorial election was held on 8 April 1979 to elect the Governor of Hokkaido Prefecture.

Candidates
Naohiro Dōgakinai - incumbent governor of Hokkaido Prefecture, age 64
Kozo Igarashi - former mayor of Asahikawa, Hokkaidō and candidate in the 1975 Hokkaido gubernatorial election, age 53
 - company president, age 45

Results

References

北海新聞社編『北海道年鑑』1980年版（北海道新聞）

Hokkaido gubernational elections
1979 elections in Japan